, read as yori, is a kana ligature – a typographic ligature in the Japanese language – consisting of a combination of the hiragana graphs of  (/yo/ ) and  (/ri/ ), and thus represents their combined sound, より (/yori/ ) "from". It is drawn with two strokes. It is uncommon and found almost exclusively in vertical writing.

In Unicode

See also

 Yo (kana)
 Ri (kana)
 Koto (kana)
 Katakana

Specific kana